The Council of Capharthutha (also Kafartut or Kafr Tut) was a synod of the Syriac Orthodox Church held in February 869 AD under Patriarch John IV of Antioch. It was called to resolve the differences between the Patriarch of Antioch and the Maphrian of the East over their ecclesiastical jurisdiction in Mesopotamia and Persia. It aimed to regulate mutual relations and to resolve some difficulties that were frequently arising between two centers.

Canons
The assembly codified eight canons preserved in Bar Hebraeus' 13th-century nomocanon, the Kthobo d-Hudoye (Book of Guides):

 The bishops and the monks in the Mar Mathai's Monastery, should submit to and obey the Maphrian whose seat is in Tigris
 The Patriarch should not interfere in the administration of the Church in Tigris, unless when invited. In the same way the maphrian should not interfere in the Patriarchal See
 When the Maphrian is present along with the Patriarch of Antioch he should be seated immediately at the right hand side of the Patriarch. The name of the Maphrian shall be mentioned immediately after that of the Patriarch, in the liturgy; and he should receive the Holy Qurobo after the Patriarch
 When a Maphrian is alive, a Patriarch should not be installed without his concurrence, otherwise, the orientals shall have the right to install the Maphrian by themselves. The question of who should perform the laying on of hands on the new Patriarch - i.e., the Maphrian or the President of the Synod, shall be decided by four bishops, two each elected by the orientals and the westerners (Antiochan) respectively
 The Archdiocese of Kurdu, Beth-Sabdaya and also Najran, provided, the Arabs agree to it, shall vest with Tigris administration
 The mutual excommunications between the orientals and the Antiochans shall be withdrawn
 A final decision was taken about the three bishops consecrated by the Patriarch in the see of the Maphrian
 A bishop excommunicated by the Maphrian shall also be considered as excommunicated by the Patriarch

Maphrian
The word Maphrian is an analogue of the Greek , meaning 'concerning the whole', 'universal' or 'general'. The churches later started to use this term for their chief bishops.

Maphriyono ('Maphrian') is derived from the Syriac word , 'to make fruitful', or 'one who gives fecundity'. This title be used exclusively for the head of the Syriac Orthodox Church in the East. From the mid 13th century onwards, a few occupants of the Maphrianate were also titled catholicos, but the title never came into extensive usage.

According to one of the most famous Maphriyans, Mar Gregorios Bar Ebraya (Bar Hebraeus), the Apostle Thomas was the first in the Apostolic succession of the East. Bar Ebraya did not believe that the Eastern Church was an integral part of the Antiochian Church, due to the historical context of the time in which he lived. He did, however, vigorously defend his rights, as dictated by the church canons.

Notes

Sources

Syriac Orthodox Church
Oriental Orthodoxy in Asia
History of Christianity in Asia
869
Capharthutha